Bebearia staudingeri, or Staudinger's forester, is a butterfly in the family Nymphalidae. It is found in Nigeria, Cameroon, Gabon, the Republic of the Congo, the Central African Republic and the Democratic Republic of the Congo (Equateur, Tshuapa and Sankuru). The habitat consists of forests.

Adults are attracted to fermenting fruit.

References

Butterflies described in 1893
staudingeri
Butterflies of Africa